The Samsung Galaxy Ace (also known as Samsung Galaxy Cooper in some territories) it was a smartphone manufactured by Samsung that runs the open source Android operating system. Announced and released by Samsung in February 2011, the Galaxy Ace features an 800 MHz Qualcomm MSM7227 processor with the Adreno 200 GPU. It is available in black, with back covers in three different colors: black, purple and white.

In January 2012, Samsung announced its successor, the Galaxy Ace Plus, and have since released as successor models the Galaxy Ace 2 in May 2012, the Galaxy Ace 3 in July 2013, and the Galaxy Ace 4 in August 2014.

The Galaxy Ace was a 3G smartphone, offering quad-band GSM and announced with two-band HSDPA (900/2100) at 7.2 Mbit/s. The display is a 3.5 inch TFT LCD capacitive touchscreen with its protection by a Gorilla Glass and has HVGA (320x480) resolution. There is also a 5-megapixel camera with LED flash, capable of recording videos at QVGA (320x240) resolution and VGA (640x480) resolution with the Gingerbread update, and a 1350 mAh Li-Ion battery.

Android firmware for S5830i can be flashed on S5839i (or vice versa) because they use the same hardware, but not S5830, as it does not.

Camera
The Samsung Galaxy Ace has a 5-megapixel auto-focus camera with a resolution of 2560 x 1920 pixels. It has a LED flash along with the camera for low-light scenes. It also has face and smile detection and geotagging, but does not have a shutter key. The contrast and brightness can be adjusted through on screen menu. It is also capable of up to 2x camera zoom.

Video recording

Gaming
Having an Adreno 200 GPU, and a lower processor with a lower screen resolution, the Galaxy Ace cannot run high-definition games; however, third-party developers can port some games to work on the Galaxy Ace. As in the GT-S5830i model, the device uses VideoCore IV which may introduce some improved characteristics  but has major issues with games since neither Broadcom nor Samsung shares the source code; 3D games that work in original model might have incompatibilities with GT-S5830i. Games and Applications that are ported for the ARM6 do work on this phone.

Samsung Galaxy Ace Plus

The Samsung Galaxy Ace Plus (GT-S7500[L/T/W]) is a later generation of the Samsung Galaxy Ace (GT-S5830), which was released in 2011. It features an 800 MHz single core processor and it also includes the upgraded GUI and TouchWiz 4.0 interface.

See also

Samsung Galaxy Ace Plus
Samsung Galaxy Ace 2
Samsung Galaxy Ace 3
Samsung Galaxy Ace 4

References

External links
 

I5800
Samsung smartphones
Android (operating system) devices
Mobile phones introduced in 2011
Mobile phones with user-replaceable battery